HMS St Jean d'Acre was the Royal Navy's first 101 gun screw two-decker line-of-battle ship.  She served in the Crimean War.

Construction

The St Jean d'Acre was a Surveyor's Department design.  The design was approved on 15 February 1851, and she was ordered the same day.  Her keel was laid down at Devonport Dockyard in June 1851, and she was launched on 23 March 1853.  Her construction used materials collected for a 90 gun Albion class sailing two-decker line-of-battle ship to be called St Jean d'Acre, which was ordered in 1844, but never laid down, and suspended in 1845.

Her design was a stretched version of the James Watt 91 screw two-decker.  She was a successful experiment.  In service she was very highly regarded.  The Conqueror was designed as a slightly elongated St Jean d'Acre, and was laid down on the same slip at Devonport on 25 July 1853.

Service

St Jean d'Acre was commissioned at Plymouth by Captain Henry Keppel on 21 May 1853.  She was completed for sea on 20 September 1853. She served in the Western Squadron.  Her trials at Stokes Bay were on 3 December 1853, where she made an average of 11.199 knots.

Originally it was intended to fit the 700 nhp Napier engine from the iron-frigate Simoom, but it was decided that as St Jean d'Acre was a new ship, they would order a new engine.  She was therefore fitted with a 600 nhp Penn two-cylinder horizontal single-expansion trunk engine.  The cylinders were 70.75 in diameter, with a stroke of 3.5 ft.  On her Stokes Bay trials on 3 December 1853 the engine generated 2,136 ihp.

In May 1854 she formed part of the Allied Fleet serving in the Baltic against Russia in the Crimean War.  In 1855, she joined the fleet in the Black Sea. On 7 July 1855 Captain George King took command.  In September 1856, St Jean d'Acre took Earl Granville to the coronation of Czar Alexander II at St Petersburg. Earl Granville was leader of the Liberal party in the House of Lords, and head of the British delegation to  Alexander II's coronation.  She paid off in 1857 at Plymouth.

Her second commission was from 4 February 1859 to 13 September 1861.  St Jean d'Acre served in the Channel and the Mediterranean.  She was initially commanded by Captain Thomas Pickering Thompson, until he was invalided out, and Captain Charles Gilbert John Brydone Elliot took command on 26 September 1860.  Forty two of her guns were changed at Gibraltar in July 1861 for others of modern construction.

She was reclassed as a 99-gun ship in 1862 and 81-guns in 1863.

She was sold to Castle's shipbreakers at Charlton in January 1875, and broken up October 1875.

Sources differ about her initial cost.  Lambert says £107,561, whilst Lyons and Winfield say £143,708, of which the hull accounted for £81,277 and the machinery £35,770(?).

Footnotes

External links

 Lambert, Andrew   Battleships in Transition, the Creation of the Steam Battlefleet 1815–1860,  published Conway Maritime Press, 1984.  
 Lyon, David and Winfield, Rif The Sail and Steam Navy List, All the Ships of the Royal Navy 1815–1889, published Chatham, 2004, 

Ships of the line of the Royal Navy
1853 ships
Crimean War naval ships of the United Kingdom